Saint-Vincent-de-Cosse (Languedocien: Sent Vincenç de Còssa) is a commune in the Dordogne department in Nouvelle-Aquitaine in southwestern France, on the Dordogne River.

It has two church buildings: an original Romanesque twelfth century church, Saint Vincent le Salvadou, and a nineteenth century replacement. It is named for St Vincent de Agen, a local third century saint.

Population

See also
Communes of the Dordogne department

References

Communes of Dordogne